Sinking Creek is a river in the United States state of Virginia.  Due to the karst topography northwest of Blacksburg, the river disappears underground and then re-emerges from springs as it flows into the New River.

See also
List of rivers of Virginia

References

USGS Geographic Names Information Service
USGS Hydrologic Unit Map - State of Virginia (1974)

Rivers of Virginia
Sinking rivers
Rivers of Montgomery County, Virginia
Limestone formations of the United States